Mandy Barker is a British photographer. She is mostly known for work with marine plastic debris.  Barker has worked alongside scientists in hopes of bringing awareness to the mass amount of plastic that is floating around in our oceans.

Biography 
Mandy Barker graduated from De Montfort University in England with MA in photography also studied at Leeds Metropolitan University. After graduation, she started to investigate marine plastic debris.  Barker mostly collaborates with scientists, aiming to raise public awareness of plastic pollution in the oceans. She received a National Geographic Society Grant for Research and Exploration in 2018. Barker was shortlisted for the Prix Pictet Award in 2017, as well as nominated for Deutsche Börse Photography Foundation Prize in 2018. Mandy Barker was awarded Fellowship of the Royal Photographic Society in 2019. Mandy Barker lives in Leeds.

Exhibitions

Solo 
 2018 "Mandy Barker: Hong Kong Soup", Centre for Chinese Contemporary Art, Manchester
 2019 "Sea of Artifacts". Fotografiska, Stockholm
 2019 "Mandy Barker: Altered Ocean Exhibition", Royal Photographic Society House, Bristol
 2019 "Not in my planet", Science Museum, Trento.

Group 
 2001 "Snapshot of Britain", The Photographers' Gallery, London
 2011 "Blurb PBN 2011 Awards", Aperture Foundation, New York
 2019 "Civilization: The Way We Live Now". National Gallery of Victoria.
 2019 "Civilisation: The Way We Live Now", UCCA Center for Contemporary Art, Beijing
 2019 "A History of Photography: Daguerreotype to Digital" Victoria and Albert Museum, London

Awards 
 2012 The Royal Photographic Society's Environmental Bursary
 2018 National Geographic Society Grant for Research and Exploration.

Publications

Monographs 

 2019 Altered Ocean published by Overlapse
 2018 Beyond Drifting: Digest Edition published by Overlapse
 2017 Beyond Drifting: Imperfectly Known Animals published by Overlapse (Out of Print)

Catalogues (with other artists) 

 Civilization: The Way We Live Now published by Thames & Hudson

References

External links 
 Mandy Barker's website
 Google

Photographers from Yorkshire
British environmentalists
1964 births
Living people